The Sinquefield Cup is an annual, invitation-only chess tournament in St. Louis, Missouri, United States, honoring Rex Sinquefield and his wife Jeanne, the founders of the Saint Louis Chess Club. Since 2015, the Sinquefield Cup has been a part of the Grand Chess Tour.

Winners

{| class="sortable wikitable"
! # !! Year !! Winner(s)
|-
|align="center"|1||2013||
|-
|align="center"|2||2014||
|-
|align="center"|3||2015||
|-
|align="center"|4||2016||
|-
|align="center"|5||2017||
|-
|align="center"|6||2018||
|-
|align="center"|7||2019||
|-
|align="center"|8||2021||
|-
|align="center"|9||2022||
|}

2013
The first edition (working title: 2013 Saint Louis International) was held from 9 to 15 September 2013 at the Chess Club and Scholastic Center of Saint Louis in St. Louis, Missouri, United States. The four grandmasters played the classic time control 40 moves in 90 minutes with a 30-second increment as of move one, followed by 30 minutes for the rest of the game in double round-robin format. The total prize fund was $170,000, with $70,000 going to the winner, $50,000 to runner-up, $30,000 to third place and $20,000 to fourth place. The average FIDE rating for the field was 2797, the highest rated tournament at the time. The opening ceremony took place on 8 September 2013, and round 1 was held the next day. This was the last tournament for Magnus Carlsen before the World Chess Championship 2013.

{| class="wikitable" style="text-align:center;"
|+ 1st Sinquefield Cup, 9–15 September 2013, St. Louis, USA, Cat. XXII (2797)
! !! Player !! Rating !! 1 !! 2 !! 3 !! 4 !! Points !! TPR
|-
|- style="background:#ccffcc;"
| 1 || align="left" |  || 2862
|     || ½ ½ || ½ 1 || 1 1 || 4½ || 2968
|-
| 2 || align="left" |  || 2772
| ½ ½ ||  || 1 0 || 1 ½ || 3½ || 2862
|-
| 3 || align="left" |  || 2813
| ½ 0 || 0 1 ||  || ½ ½ || 2½ || 2735
|-
| 4 || align="left" |  || 2741
| 0 0 || 0 ½ || ½ ½ ||  || 1½ || 2623
|}

2014
The second edition was held from August 27 to September 7, at the Chess Club and Scholastic Center of Saint Louis.   It is by rating the strongest tournament in the history of chess, as measured by actual average Elo rating of 2802 for the six participants, all in the top ten of FIDE's Elo rating list: Numbers 1, 2, 3, 5, 8 and 9 in the world.

The six grandmasters again played the time control of 40 moves in 90 minutes with a 30-second increment for every move, followed by an additional 30 minutes plus the per-move-increment for the rest of the game, in a double round-robin tournament.

The total prize fund was increased to $315,000, with $100,000 going to the winner.

{| class="wikitable" style="text-align:center;"
|+ 2nd Sinquefield Cup, 27 August – 7 September 2014, St. Louis, Missouri, United States, Category XXIII (2801.7)
! !! Player !! Rating !! 1 !! 2 !! 3 !! 4 !! 5 !! 6 !! Points !! Wins !!  || TPR
|-style="background:#ccffcc;"
| 1 || align=left |  || 2801
|     || 1 ½ || 1 1 || 1 1 || 1 ½ || 1 ½ || 8½ || ||  || 3098
|-
| 2 || align=left |  || 2877
| 0 ½ ||  || ½ ½ || ½ ½ || 1 ½ || ½ 1 || 5½ || ||  || 2823
|-
| 3 || align=left |  || 2772
| 0 0 || ½ ½ ||  || 1 ½ || 0 ½ || 1 1 || 5 || ||  || 2808
|-
| 4 || align=left |  || 2768
| 0 0 || ½ ½ || 0 ½ ||  || 1 ½ || ½ ½ || 4 || 1 || 1½ || 2736
|-
| 5 || align=left |  || 2805
| 0 ½ || 0 ½ || 1 ½ || 0 ½ ||  || ½ ½ || 4 || 1 ||  ½ || 2729
|-
| 6 || align=left |  || 2787
| 0 ½ || ½ 0 || 0 0 || ½ ½ || ½ ½ ||  || 3 || ||   || 2656
|}
After round 7, Caruana had achieved a score of 7/7, which was described as a "historical achievement" by Levon Aronian. Caruana drew his remaining games to finish with 8½/10 and a performance rating of 3098, the highest ever performance rating in a single tournament, besting Carlsen's performance in the 2009 Nanjing Pearl Spring tournament and Anatoly Karpov in the 1994 Linares chess tournament. It was compared to Bobby Fischer's 20-game winning streak in 1970–1971.

Vachier-Lagrave finished fourth, ahead of Aronian on tie-break (direct encounter).

2015
The third edition was held from August 22 to September 3, at the Chess Club and Scholastic Center of Saint Louis as the second leg in the 2015 Grand Chess Tour.  The tournament featured the seven top players in the world, a feat only surpassed by the AVRO 1938 chess tournament.  The Sinquefield Cup is also the strongest tournament featured in the 2015 Grand Chess Tour with an average FIDE Rating of 2795.

The 2015 Sinquefield Cup was a single round-robin event held with a time control of 40 moves in 2 hours, followed by the rest of the game in 1 hour with a 30-second increment from move 41.  Wesley So was selected as the tournament invite and joined the nine other players already participating in the Grand Chess Tour.

{| class="wikitable" style="text-align:center;"
|+ 3rd Sinquefield Cup, 22 August – 3 September 2015, St. Louis, Missouri, United States, Category XXII (2794.6)
! !! Player !! Rating !! 1 !! 2 !! 3 !! 4 !! 5 !! 6 !! 7 !! 8 !! 9 !! 10 !! Points !!  !!  !! SB !! TPR !! Tour Points
|-style="background:#ccffcc;"
| 1 || align=left |  || 2765 ||   || ½ || 1 || ½ || ½ || ½ || ½ || 1 || ½ || 1 || 6 || || || || 2923 || 13
|-
| 2 || align=left |  || 2853 || ½ ||  || ½ || 1 || ½ || 0 || 0 || 1 || ½ || 1 || 5 || 3 || ½ || 21.25 || 2831 || 10
|-
| 3 || align=left |  || 2814 || 0 || ½ ||  || ½ || ½ || 1 || 0 || ½ || 1 || 1 || 5 || 3 || ½ || 20.25 || 2835 || 8
|-
| 4 || align=left |  || 2731 || ½ || 0 || ½ ||  || ½ || ½ || 1 || ½ || ½ || 1 || 5 || 2 || || || 2845 || 7
|-
| 5 || align=left |  || 2793 || ½ || ½ || ½ || ½ ||  || 1 || ½ || ½ || ½ || ½ || 5 || 1 || || || 2838 || 6
|-
| 6 || align=left |  || 2771 || ½ || 1 || 0 || ½ || 0 ||  || ½ || 1 || 1 || 0 || 4½ || 3 || || || 2797 || 5
|-
| 7 || align=left |  || 2816 || ½ || 1 || 1 || 0 || ½ || ½ ||  || 0 || ½ || ½ || 4½ || 2 || || || 2792 || 4
|-
| 8 || align=left |  || 2808 || 0 || 0 || ½ || ½ || ½ || 0 || 1 ||  || ½ || ½ || 3½ || 1 || || || 2713 || 3
|-
| 9 || align=left |  || 2816 || ½ || ½ || 0 || ½ || ½ || 0 || ½ || ½ ||  ||  ½ || 3½ || 0 || || || 2712 || 2
|-
| 10 || align=left |  || 2779 || 0 || 0 || 0 || 0 || ½ || 1 || ½ || ½ || ½ ||  || 3 || || || || 2671 || 1
|}

2016

The 4th Sinquefield Cup was played between August 4 and 16, 2016. It was rescheduled due to a clash with the 2016 Baku Chess Olympiad. This Sinquefield Cup is one of the tournaments of the 2nd Grand Chess Tour. Ding Liren was selected as the Wild Card for the Sinquefield Cup. Vladimir Kramnik withdrew from Sinquefield Cup for health reasons. Fellow Russian player Peter Svidler replaced him.

The prize fund was US$300,000, with $75,000 for 1st place, and points toward the overall 2016 Grand Chess Tour. Players received 120 minutes for 40 moves then 60 minutes for the rest of the game with an additional 30 seconds added per move starting from move 41. In case of a 2-way tie, a 2-game Rapid Match (10 minutes + 5 seconds increment starting from Move #1) followed by a 2-game Blitz Match (5 minutes + 2 seconds increment starting from Move #1) if tied again was to be played. If a tie after the Blitz match, an Armageddon game would decide the winner. All ratings listed below are from the August 2016 rating list.

On August 14, 2016, Wesley So won the tournament, with 5½ points out of 9 (+2−0=7), ahead of former World Champions Veselin Topalov and Viswanathan Anand, and former winners Levon Aronian and Fabiano Caruana.

{| class="wikitable" style="text-align:center;"
|+ 4th Sinquefield Cup, 4–16 August 2016, St. Louis, Missouri, United States, Category XXII (2778.6)
! !! Player !! Rating !! 1 !! 2 !! 3 !! 4 !! 5 !! 6 !! 7 !! 8 !! 9 !! 10 !! Points !! Wins !! SB !! TPR !! Tour Points
|-style="background:#ccffcc;"
| 1 || align=left |  || 2771 ||   || ½ || 1 || ½ || ½ || 1 || ½ || ½ || ½ || ½ || 5½ || || || 2859 || 13
|-
| 2 || align=left |  || 2792 || ½ ||  || ½ || ½ || ½ || 1 || 0 || ½ || 1 || ½ || 5 || 2 || 21.75 || 2820 || 7.75
|-
| 3 || align=left |  || 2761 || 0 || ½ ||  || ½ || ½ || ½ || ½ || 1 || 1 || ½ || 5 || 2 || 21.00 || 2823 || 7.75
|-
| 4 || align=left |  || 2770 || ½ || ½ || ½ ||  || ½ || ½ || 1 || ½ || ½ || ½ || 5 || 1 || 22.25 || 2822 || 7.75
|-
| 5 || align=left |  || 2807 || ½ || ½ || ½ || ½ ||  || ½ || ½ || ½ || ½ || 1 || 5 || 1 || 21.50 || 2818 || 7.75
|-
| 6 || align=left |  || 2791 || 0 || 0 || ½ || ½ || ½ ||  || ½ || 1 || ½ || 1 || 4½ || 2 || || 2777 ||  4.5
|-
| 7 || align=left |  || 2819 || ½ || 1 || ½ || 0 || ½ || ½ ||  || ½ || ½ || ½ || 4½ || 1 || || 2774 || 4.5
|-
| 8 || align=left |  || 2755 || ½ || ½ || 0 || ½ || ½ || 0 || ½ ||  || 1 || ½ || 4 || || ||  2738 || 3
|-
| 9 || align=left |  || 2751 || ½ || 0 || 0 || ½ || ½ || ½ || ½ || 0 ||  || 1 || 3½ || || || 2701 || 2
|-
| 10 || align=left |  || 2769 || ½  || ½ || ½ || ½ || 0 || 0 || ½ || ½ || 0 ||  || 3 || || || 2654 || 1
|}

2017
The 5th Sinquefield Cup was played from August 2 to August 11, 2017, and was the third leg of the 2017 Grand Chess Tour. It was won by Maxime Vachier-Lagrave, with 6 points out of 9 (+3−0=6).

{| class="wikitable" style="text-align:center;"
|+ 5th Sinquefield Cup, 2–11 August 2017, St. Louis, Missouri, United States, Category XXII (2787.7)
! !! Player !! Rating !! 1 !! 2 !! 3 !! 4 !! 5 !! 6 !! 7 !! 8 !! 9 !! 10 !! Points !!  !!  !! TPR !! Tour Points
|-
|-style="background:#ccffcc;"
| 1 || align=left |  || 2789 ||   || 1 || ½ || ½ || ½ || ½ || ½ || ½ || 1 || 1 || 6 || || || 2907 || 13
|-
| 2 || align=left |  || 2822 || 0 ||  || ½ || 1 || 1 || ½ || ½ || ½ || 1 || ½ || 5½ || 3 || || 2862 || 9
|-
| 3 || align=left |  || 2783 || ½ || ½ ||  || ½ || ½ || ½ || 1 || ½ || ½ || 1 || 5½ || 2 || || 2866 || 9
|-
| 4 || align=left |  || 2799 || ½ || 0 || ½ ||  || ½ || ½ || 0 || 1 || 1 || 1 || 5 || 3 || || 2825 || 6.5
|-
| 5 || align=left |  || 2773 || ½ || 0 || ½ || ½ ||  || 1 || ½ || ½ || 1 || ½ || 5 || 2 || || 2828 || 6.5
|-
| 6 || align=left |  || 2751 || ½ || ½ || ½ || ½ || 0 ||  || 1 || ½ || ½ || ½ || 4½ || || || 2792 || 5
|-
| 7 || align=left |  || 2807 || ½ || ½ || 0 || 1 || ½ || 0 ||  || ½ || ½ || ½ || 4 || || || 2747 || 4
|-
| 8 || align=left |  || 2792 || ½ || ½ || ½ || 0 || ½ || ½ || ½ ||  || ½ || 0 || 3½ || || || 2709 || 3
|-
| 9 || align=left |  || 2810 || 0 || 0 || ½ || 0 || 0 || ½ || ½ || ½ ||  || 1 || 3 || 1 || 1 || 2665 || 1.5
|-
| 10 || align=left |  || 2751 || 0  || ½ || 0 || 0 || ½ || ½ || ½ || 1 || 0 ||  || 3 || 1 || 0 || 2672 || 1.5
|}

2018
The 6th Sinquefield Cup was the fourth leg on the Grand Chess Tour 2018; Carlsen, Caruana and Aronian tied for first, all with 5½ points out of 9 (+2−0=7). The deciding tiebreaker involved the drawing of lots to decide which two players would participate in the playoff for the title. Carlsen objected to this random chance tiebreaker and proposed a three-way playoff. Caruana did not agree to the three-way playoff as he had a playoff with Wesley So for a place at the 2018 London Chess Classic scheduled on the same day (Caruana would qualify to London after beating So in a playoff 1.5–0.5). The trio reached a compromise and agreed to share the title.

{| class="wikitable mw-collapsible" style="text-align: center;"
|+ 6th Sinquefield Cup, 18–28 August 2018, St. Louis, Missouri, United States, Category XXII (2787.5)
! !! Player !! Rating !! 1 !! 2 !! 3 !! 4 !! 5 !! 6 !! 7 !! 8 !! 9 !! 10 !! Points !!  !!  ||  || TPR !! Tour Points
|- style="background:#ccffcc;"
| rowspan="3" | 1–3 || align="left" |  || 2842 || || ½ || ½ || ½ || ½ || ½ || ½ || ½ || 1 || 1 || 5½ || 1 || 2 || 0 || 2861 || 15
|- style="background:#ccffcc;"
| align="left" | || 2822 || ½ || || ½ || ½ || ½ || ½ || ½ || ½ || 1 || 1 || 5½|| 1 || 2 || 0 || 2864 || 15
|- style="background:#ccffcc;"
| align="left" |  || 2767 || ½ || ½ || || ½ || 1 || ½ || ½ || ½ || ½ || 1 || 5½ || 1 || 2 || 0 || 2870 || 15
|-
| 4 || align=left |  || 2801 || ½ || ½ || ½ ||  || ½ || ½ || ½ || 1 || ½ || ½ || 5 ||  || 1 || 0 || 2829 || 10
|-
| 5 || align=left |  || 2766 || ½ || ½ || 0 || ½ ||  || ½ || ½ || ½ || 1 || ½ || 4½ || 1 || 1 || 1 || 2790 || 6
|-
| 6–7 || align=left |  || 2779 || ½ || ½ || ½ || ½ || ½ ||  || ½ || ½ || ½ || ½ || 4½ || 1 || 0 || 0 || 2788 || 6
|-
| 6–7 || align=left |  || 2768 || ½ || ½ || ½ || ½ || ½ || ½ ||  || ½ || ½ || ½ || 4½ || 1 || 0 || 0 || 2790 || 6
|-
| 8 || align=left |  || 2780 || ½ || ½ || ½ || 0 || ½ || ½ || ½ ||  || ½ || ½ || 4 ||  || 0 || 0 || 2745 || 3
|-
| 9–10 || align=left |  || 2777 || 0 || 0 || ½ || ½ || 0 || ½ || ½ || ½ ||  || ½ || 3 || ½ || 0 || 0 || 2664 || 1.5
|-
| 9–10 || align=left |  || 2773 || 0 || 0 || 0 || ½ || ½ || ½ || ½ || ½ || ½ ||  || 3 || ½ || 0 || 0 || 2664 || 1.5
|}

2019
The 7th Sinquefield Cup was played from August 17 to August 29, 2019, and was the fifth leg of the 2019 Grand Chess Tour. It was won by Ding Liren on tiebreaks, 3–1. Ding Liren and Magnus Carlsen were tied with 6½ points out of 11 (+2−0=9). The prize fund was US$325,000, with $82,500 for 1st place.

{| class="wikitable" style="text-align: center;"
|+ 7th Sinquefield Cup, 17–29 August 2019, St. Louis, Missouri, United States, Category XXII (2782.5)
! !! Player !! Rating !! 1 !! 2 !! 3 !! 4 !! 5 !! 6 !! 7 !! 8 !! 9 !! 10 !! 11 !! 12 !! Points !! TB !! Place !! TPR !! GCT Points
|-style="background:#ccffcc;"
| 1 || align=left||| 2805 || || ½ || ½ || ½ || 1 || 1 || ½ || ½ || ½ || ½ || ½ || ½ ||6½ || 3 || 1 || 2845 || 16½
|-
| 2 || align=left| || 2882 || ½ ||  || ½ || ½ || ½ || ½ || ½ || ½ || 1 || ½ || 1 || ½ ||6½ || 1 || 2 || 2838 || 16½
|-
| 3 || align=left| || 2756 || ½ || ½ ||  || ½ || ½ || ½ || 1 || ½ || ½ || ½ || ½ || ½ ||6 || || 3–4 || 2820 || 11
|-
| 4 || align=left| || 2750 || ½ || ½ || ½ ||  || ½ || ½ || ½ || ½ || 1 || ½ || ½ || ½ ||6 || || 3–4 || 2821 || 11
|-
| 5 || align=left| || 2818 || 0 || ½ || ½ || ½ ||  || ½ || ½ || ½ || ½ || ½ || ½ || 1 ||5½ || || 5–8 || 2779 || 6½
|-
| 6 || align=left| || 2779 || 0 || ½ || ½ || ½ || ½ ||  || 1 || ½ || ½ || ½ || ½ || ½ ||5½ || || 5–8 || 2782 || 6½
|-
| 7 || align=left| || 2774 || ½ || ½ || 0 || ½ || ½ || 0 ||  || ½ || 0 || 1 || 1 || 1  ||5½ || || 5–8 || 2783 || 6½
|-
| 8 || align=left| || 2764 || ½ || ½ || ½ || ½ || ½ || ½ || ½ ||  || ½ || ½ || ½ || ½ ||5½ || || 5–8 || 2784 || 6½
|-
| 9 || align=left| || 2778 || ½ || 0 || ½ || 0 || ½ || ½ || 1 || ½ ||  || ½ || ½ || ½ ||5 || || 9–10 || 2746 || 3½
|-
| 10 || align=left| || 2743 || ½ || ½ || ½ || ½ || ½ || ½ || 0 || ½ || ½ ||  || ½ || ½ ||5 || || 9–10 || 2750 || 3½
|-
| 11 || align=left| || 2776 || ½ || 0 || ½ || ½ || ½ || ½ || 0 || ½ || ½ || ½ ||  || ½ ||4½ || || 11–12 || 2718 || 1½
|-
| 12 || align=left| || 2765 || ½ || ½ || ½ || ½ || 0 || ½ || 0 || ½ || ½ || ½ || ½ ||  ||4½ || || 11–12 || 2719 || 1½
|}

{| class="wikitable" style="text-align: center;"
|+ First place playoff, 29 August 2019, St. Louis, Missouri, United States
! Place !! Player !! Rapid rating !! Blitz rating !! colspan="2" | Rapid !! colspan="2" | Blitz !! Score
|-
| 1 || align=left|
|| 2786 || 2779
| style="background: black; color: white" | ½
| style="background: white; color: black" | ½ 
| style="background: white; color: black" | 1
| style="background: black; color: white" | 1
|| 3
|-
| 2 || align=left|
|| 2895 || 2920
| style="background: white; color: black" | ½
| style="background: black; color: white" | ½
| style="background: black; color: white" | 0
| style="background: white; color: black" | 0
|| 1
|}

2021
The 8th Sinquefield Cup was played from August 16 to August 28, 2021, after a break in 2020 due to the COVID-19 pandemic. The tournament was the fifth leg of Grand Chess Tour 2021. It was won by Maxime Vachier-Lagrave, with 6 points out of 9 (+4−1=4). 
{| class="wikitable" style="text-align:center;"
|+ 8th Sinquefield Cup, 16–28 August St. Louis, Missouri, United States, Category XX (2742.0)
! !! Player !! Rating !! 1 !! 2 !! 3 !! 4 !! 5 !! 6 !! 7 !! 8 !! 9 !! 10 !! Points !!  !!  !! SB !! Koya !! TPR !! Tour Points
|-style="background:#ccffcc;"
| 1 || align=left |  || 2751 ||   || ½ || 0 || ½ || ½ || 1 || 1 || ½ || 1 || 1 || 6 || || 4|| || || 2919 || 13 
|-
| 2 || align=left |  || 2806 || ½ ||  || ½ || ½ || ½ || 1 || 0 || 1 || ½ || 1 || 5½ || 1 || 3 || || || 2824 || 8.3
|-
| 3 || align=left |  || 2758 || 1 || ½ ||  || ½ || ½ || ½ || ½ || ½ || ½ || 1 || 5½ || 1 || 2 || 24.00 || || 2829 || 8.3
|-
| 4 || align=left |  || 2772 || ½ || ½ || ½ ||   || ½ || ½ || ½ || ½ || 1 || 1 || 5½ || 1 || 2 || 22.75 || || 2828 || 8.3
|-
| 5 || align=left |  || 2763 || ½ || ½ || ½ || ½ ||  || ½ || ½ || 0 || 1 || ½ || 4½ ||  || || || || 2740 || 6
|-
| 6 || align=left |  || 2709 || 0 || 0 || ½ || ½ || ½ ||   || ½ || 1 || ½ || ½ || 4 || 1½ || || || || 2701 || 4
|-
| 7 || align=left |  || 2710 || 0 || 1 || ½ || ½ || ½ || ½ ||  || ½ || ½ || 0 || 4 || 1 || || || || 2701 || 4
|-
| 8 || align=left |  || 2782 || ½ || 0 || ½ || ½ || 1 || 0 || ½ ||  || ½ || ½ || 4 || ½ || || || || 2693 || 4
|-
| 9 || align=left |  || 2714 || 0 || ½ || ½ || 0 || 0 || ½ || ½ ||  ½||  || 1 || 3½ || || || || || 2656 || 2
|-
| 10 || align=left |  || 2655 || 0 || 0 || 0 || 0 || ½ || ½ || 1 || ½ || 0 ||  || 2½ || || || || || 2574 || 1
|}

2022
The 9th Sinquefield Cup was played from September 1 to September 13, 2022, and was the fifth leg of the Grand Chess Tour 2022. Before the start of the fourth round, Magnus Carlsen withdrew from the tournament during the 2022 Carlsen-Niemann controversy. Subsequently, the three games he had already played were annulled for the standings of the Sinquefield Cup, but they were still included for rating points. Alireza Firouzja won the tournament after beating Ian Nepomniachtchi in a two game playoff.

In the table, games with Magnus Carlsen are not counted towards the total of each player's points or wins. 
{| class="wikitable" style="text-align:center;"
|+ Sinquefield Cup, 2–11 September Saint Louis, Missouri, United States Category XXI (2766.6)
! !! Player !! Rating !! 1 !! 2 !! 3 !! 4 !! 5 !! 6 !! 7 !! 8 !! 9 !! 10 !! Points !!  !!  !!  !! SB !! Koya !! TPR !! Tour Points
|- style="background: #ccffcc;"
| 1 || align=left |  || 2778 ||   || 0|| 1|| ½|| ½|| ½|| 1|| ½|| 1|| –|| 5 || 1½|| || || || || 2844|| 11
|-
| 2 || align=left |  || 2792 || 1||  || ½|| ½|| ½|| ½|| 1|| ½|| ½|| 0|| 5 || ½|| || || || || 2804|| 11
|-
| 3 || align=left |  || 2771|| 0|| ½||  || 1|| ½|| 1|| ½|| ½|| ½|| –|| 4½ || || 1|| || || || 2799|| 7.5 
|-
| 4 || align=left |  || 2758 || ½|| ½|| 0 ||  || ½|| 1|| ½|| 1|| ½|| –|| 4½ || || 0|| || || || 2801|| 7.5
|-
| 5 || align=left |  || 2745 || ½|| ½|| ½|| ½||  || ½|| ½|| ½|| ½|| –|| 4 || || || || || || 2758|| 6
|-
| 6 || align=left |  || 2078 || ½|| ½|| 0|| 0|| ½||  || ½|| ½|| 1|| 1|| 3½ || || ½|| 1|| 13.50|| || 2775|| 4.5
|-
| 7 || align=left |  || 2759 || 0|| 0|| ½|| ½|| ½|| ½||  || 1|| ½|| ½|| 3½  || || ½|| 1|| 12.75|| || 2727|| 4.5
|-
| 8 || align=left |  || 2757 || ½ || ½|| ½|| 0|| ½|| ½|| 0||  || ½|| –|| 3 || || ½|| 0 || 12.50|| || 2665|| 2.5
|-
| 9 || align=left |  || 2757 || 0|| ½|| ½|| ½|| ½|| 0|| ½|| ½||  || –|| 3 || || ½|| 0 || 12.25 || || 2665|| 2.5
|-
| 10 || align=left |  || 2861 || –|| 1|| –|| –|| –|| 0|| ½|| –|| –||  ||  || || || || || || 2746|| 1
|}

References

External links
 
Pictured is 2022 winner Alireza Firouzja, flanked by Jeanne and Rex Sinquefield.

Chess competitions
Chess in the United States
Sports in St. Louis
International sports competitions hosted by the United States
2013 establishments in the United States
Recurring sporting events established in 2013